Fuck the World may refer to:

Songs
 "Fuck the World" (Insane Clown Posse song), 1999
 "Fuck the World (F.T.W.)", by Turbonegro, 2003
 "Fuck the World", by 2Pac from Me Against the World, 1995
 "Fuck the World", by Dope from American Apathy, 2005
 "Fuck the World", by Hollywood Undead from Day of the Dead, 2015
 "Fuck tha World", by Lil Wayne from Tha Block Is Hot, 1999
 "Fuck the World", by the Queers from Love Songs for the Retarded, 1993
 "Fuck the World", by Rod Wave from Pray 4 Love, 2020
 "Fuck the World", by the Vines from Winning Days, 2004

Other uses
 Fuck the World (artwork), a 2018 mural by Carolina Falkholt
 Fuck the World Championship, a professional wrestling championship
 Kesha and the Creepies: Fuck the World Tour, a 2016–2017 concert tour by Kesha
 Fuck the World (EP), 2020

See also
 FTW (disambiguation)